Howell Hill is a   nature reserve east of Ewell in Surrey. It is owned by Surrey County Council and managed by the Surrey Wildlife Trust.

There are chalk spoil heaps on this calcareous grassland site. Around 260 species of flowering plants have been recorded, including mouse-eared hawkweed, kidney vetch, common spotted orchid, common knapweed, fragrant orchid and white helleborine orchid.

References

Surrey Wildlife Trust